XSG may refer to:

 Great Lakes XSG, an amphibious observation aircraft developed in the United States in the early 1930s
 XSG, the station code for Xiaoshan International Airport station, Zhejiang, China